Amos Fish Mahlalela (born 29 August 1962) is a South African politician. Since 7 May 2014 he has held a seat for the African National Congress in the National Assembly of South Africa and is the Deputy Minister of Tourism in South Africa.

Biography 
Mahlalela was born in the village of Mbuzini in Mpumalanga Province. He obtained his matric certificate from Nkomazi High School, and got an Honors Degree in Governance and Leadership from the University of the Witwatersrand.

He has served in the government for over 21 years and is a former regional Transport Minister, as well a former member of the provincial executive council of Mpumalanga.

In 2002, Mahlalela won the African National Congress chairmanship of Mpumalanga.

Mahlalela has been a member of the African National Congress since 1980.

References

External links 
 Mr Amos Fish Mahlalela at People's Assembly
 Amos Fish Mahlalela member page at Parliament of South Africa

1962 births
Living people
People from Nkomazi Local Municipality
African National Congress politicians
Members of the National Assembly of South Africa
University of the Witwatersrand alumni